Kandal or Kondel may refer to:

Places
Kandal Province, a province of Cambodia
Kandal (National Assembly constituency), parliamentary constituency based in Kandal 
Kandal, Hormozgan, a village in Iran
Kandal, Kohgiluyeh and Boyer-Ahmad, a village in Iran
Kandal, Kurdistan, a village in Iran
Kandal, Sistan and Baluchestan, a village in Iran
Kondel, Sistan and Baluchestan, a village in Iran
Kandal, West Azerbaijan, a village in Iran
Kandal, Iraq, a village in Iraq
Kandal, Norway, a village in Gloppen, Sogn og Fjordane, Norway

Other
Bhatia (caste), a caste of kings originating in Sindh Province and Rajasthan